The 87th 2010 Lithuanian Athletics Championships were held in S. Darius and S. Girėnas Stadium, Kaunas on 9–10 July 2010.

Men

Women

References 
Results

External links 
 Lithuanian athletics

Lithuanian Athletics Championships
Athletics
Lithuanian Athletics Championships